The DeTas-Yayasan Pahang are the Malaysia Hockey League (MHL) team from Kuantan, Pahang, Malaysia.

Current Team Players

First-Team Squad

Former Import Players

   Ali Ahmedda Malik - 2005

Club Officials

Coaching And Medical Staff

 Manager:           Syed Abdul Puk 
 Chief Coach:       Ricky Falder

Chief Coach History

Honours

 Malaysia Hockey League Titles         : 
 MHL-TNB Cup/Overall Champions Titles   : 1 (1990)
 Hockey Asian Champion Clubs Cup Titles: 1 (1991)

See also

 Malaysia Hockey League

References

Malaysian field hockey clubs